"Don't Stop the Music" is a song by the American singer Lionel Richie. It was written by Richie, Paul Barry and Mark Taylor for his sixth studio album, Renaissance (2000), and produced by Brian Rawling and Taylor. The song was released as the album's second single in late 2000 by Island Def Jam.

Track listing 
CD Maxi Single
 "Don't Stop the Music" (Album Version) - 4:13 
 "Don't Stop the Music" (Joey Negro Revival Mix Radio Edit) - 3:38
 "Shout It To The World" - 4:37
 "All Night Long" (Live from Edinburgh Castle) - 5:26

UK CD Single
 "Don't Stop the Music" (Radio Edit) - 3:38
 "Dancing On The Ceiling" (Live) - 4:30
 "Angel" (Boogieman Remix Radio Edit) - 4:02

CD Single Promo LRCDP4
 "Don't Stop The Music" (The Joey Negro Revival Mix Radio Edit) - 3:38 
 "Don't Stop The Music" (The Joey Negro Rodox Dub) - 6:17 
 "Don't Stop The Music" (Original Version Radio Edit) - 3:36

Charts

References

2000 singles
2001 singles
Lionel Richie songs
Dance-pop songs
Songs written by Lionel Richie
House music songs
2000 songs
Songs written by Mark Taylor (record producer)
Disco songs
Island Records singles
Songs written by Paul Barry (songwriter)